The following is a list of notable events and releases of the year 1984 in Norwegian music.

Events

April
 13 – The 11th Vossajazz started in Voss, Norway (April 13 – 15).

May
 23 – 12th Nattjazz started in Bergen, Norway (May 23 – June 6).

June
 27 – The 15th Kalvøyafestivalen started at Kalvøya near by Oslo.

Albums released

Unknown date

R

Terje Rypdal
 Eos (ECM Records), with David Darling

S

Thorgeir Stubø
 Live at Jazz Alive (Odin Records)

Øystein Sunde
 I Husbukkens Tegn (Odin Records)

Deaths

August
 12 – Arild Sandvold, organist, composer, and choir conductor (born 1895).

September
 3 – Rolf Gammleng, classical violinist and organizational leader (born 1898).

November
 8 – Carl Gustav Sparre Olsen, classical violinist and composer (born 1903).

Births

January
 4 – Trond Bersu, jazz drummer.
 20 – Jorun Stiansen, pop singer and artist.

February
 12 – Aylar Lie, singer and actress.
 20 – Mari Kvien Brunvoll, singer and composer.

April
 4 – Steinar Aadnekvam, jazz guitarist.
 10 – Anders Brørby, composer and sound artist.
 26 – Andrea Rydin Berge,  jazz singer and pianist

May
 25 – Marion Raven, singer and songwriter.
 28 – Ina Wroldsen, singer and songwriter.
 29 – Jo Berger Myhre, jazz upright bassist, Splashgirl.

June
 18 – Frida Ånnevik, jazz and folk singer.

July
 8 – Jo Skaansar, jazz upright bassist and composer.
 13 – Ida Maria, rock guitarist, singer, and songwriter.

August
 14 – Kristoffer Kompen, jazz trombonist.

September
 20 – Lars Vaular, rapper and songwriter.

October
 3 – Marika Lejon, singer and songwriter.
 17 – Anja Eline Skybakmoen, jazz singer and composer.

November
 22 – Nathalie Nordnes, singer and songwriter.
 27 – Jon Kristian Fjellestad, organist and composer.

December
 17 – Jørgen Mathisen, jazz saxophonist and clarinetist.

See also
 1984 in Norway
 Music of Norway
 Norway in the Eurovision Song Contest 1984

References

 
Norwegian music
Norwegian
Music
1980s in Norwegian music